Cake Hole may refer to:

 As a crude phrase, the mouth

In music
Cakehole, a song by The Crystal Method on their Community Service album
A remix by Evil Nine for Distinct'ive Records' Y4K series on the ILS Presents: Y4K album.
"Cakewhole", a remix by Ferocious Mullet for Distinct'ive Records' Y4K series on the Überzone Presents: Y4K album.